Timothy or Tim Adams may refer to:

 Timothy D. Adams (born 1961), Undersecretary of the U.S. Department of the Treasury 2005–2007
 Timothy Adams (actor) (born 1967), American actor and model
 Timothy Adams (poker player) (born 1986), Canadian poker player from Burlington, Ontario
 Timothy Adams Jr., professor of music

See also
 Tim Adams Memorial Trophy